Muriwai  is a settlement and rural community at the southern end of Poverty Bay, in the Gisborne District of New Zealand's North Island, south of Manutuke. The main settlement is just west of Young Nick's Head. State Highway 2 runs through Muriwai on its way from Gisborne to Hawke's Bay.

Marae

The settlement has two marae, belonging to the Ngāi Tāmanuhiri hapū of Ngāi Tawehi, Ngāti Kahutia, Ngāti Rangitauwhiwhia, Ngāti Rangiwaho and Ngāti Rangiwahomatua:  Muriwai Marae and Te Poho o Tamanuhiri meeting house, and Waiari Marae and meeting house.

In October 2020, the Government committed $462,318 from the Provincial Growth Fund to upgrade the marae.

Education

Muriwai School is a Year 1–8 co-educational public primary school. In 2019, it was a decile 2 school with a roll of 23.

References

Populated places in the Gisborne District